Jaime López (15th century) was a Spanish painter, active during the early-Renaissance period. He was nicknamed El Muño. He was born in Madrid. He decorated the Hermitage of our Lady of Prado.

References

Spanish Baroque painters
15th-century Spanish painters
Spanish male painters